Navarretia heterandra is an uncommon species of flowering plant in the phlox family known by the common name Tehama pincushionplant, or Tehama navarretia.

Distribution
It is native to northern California and southern Oregon, where it is found in moist areas on grasslands, such as vernal pools.

Description
Navarretia heterandra is a hairy annual herb producing a thin decumbent stem no more than 11 centimeters long. The leaves are divided into threadlike or needlelike lobes. The inflorescence is a compact, hairy head lined with red-tipped greenish bracts. The flowers are white with purple-spotted tubular throats. They are under a centimeter long and have four or five lobes in their corollas.

External links
Jepson Manual Treatment
Photo gallery

heterandra
Flora of California
Flora of Oregon
Flora of the Cascade Range
Natural history of the Central Valley (California)
Flora without expected TNC conservation status